Armenian mythology originated in ancient Indo-European traditions, specifically Proto-Armenian, and gradually incorporated Hurro-Urartian, Mesopotamian, Iranian, and Greek beliefs and deities.

Formation of Armenian mythology

The pantheon of Armenian gods, initially worshipped by Proto-Armenians, inherited their essential elements from the religious beliefs and mythologies of the Proto-Indo-Europeans and peoples of the Armenian Highlands. Historians distinguish a significant body of Indo-European language words which were used in Armenian pagan rites. The oldest cults are believed to have worshipped a creator called Ar  (or possibly Ara), embodied as the sun (Arev or Areg); the ancient Armenians called themselves "children of the sun". Also among the most ancient types of Indo-European-derived worship are the cults of eagles and lions, and of the sky.

After the establishment of Iranian dominance in Armenia in the 1st millennium BCE, Zoroastrianism had a major influence on  Armenian religion. Until the late Parthian period, the Armenian lands adhered to a syncretic form of Mazdaism, which mixed Iranian religious concepts with traditional Armenian beliefs. For example, the supreme god of the Armenian pantheon, Vanatur, was later replaced by Aramazd (the Parthian form of Ahura Mazda). However, the Armenian version of Aramazd preserved many native Armenian aspects. Similarly, the traditional Armenian goddess of fertility, Nar, was replaced by Anahit, which may derived from Persian Anahita, although the Armenian goddess was entirely distinct from her Iranian counterpart.

In the Hellenistic age (3rd to 1st centuries BCE), ancient Armenian deities were identified with ancient Greek deities: Aramazd with Zeus, Anahit with Artemis, Vahagn with Heracles, Astłik with Aphrodite, Nane with Athena, Mihr with Hephaestus, Tir with Apollo.

After the formal adoption of Christianity in the 4th century CE, ancient myths and beliefs transformed to adhere more closely to Christian beliefs. Biblical characters took over the functions of the archaic gods and spirits. For example, John the Baptist inherited certain features of Vahagn and Tir, and the archangel Gabriel took on elements of Vahagn.

Basic information about Armenian pagan traditions were preserved in the works of ancient Greek authors such as Plato, Herodotus, Xenophon and Strabo, Byzantine scholar Procopius of Caesarea, as well as medieval Armenian writers such as Movses Khorenatsi, Agathangelos, Eznik of Kolb, Sebeos, and Anania Shirakatsi, as well as in oral folk traditions.

Pantheon
The pantheon of pre-Christian Armenia changed over the centuries.  Originally native Armenian in nature, the pantheon was modified through, Hurro-Urartian, Semitic, Iranian and Greek influences.

One common motif that spanned many or all pagan Armenian pantheons was the belief in a ruling triad of supreme gods, usually comprising a chief, creator god, his thunder god son, and a mother goddess.

Early Armenian
These gods are believed to have been native Armenian gods, worshipped during the earliest eras of Armenian history (Proto-Armenian). Many, if not all, of them are believed to have derived from Proto-Indo-European religion. There is also likely influence from the indigenous beliefs of the Armenian Highlands.

Areg (Arev) or Ar, god of the Sun, comparable with Mesopotamian Utu. Likely also known as, or developed into, Ara. This god was probably mentioned on the Urartian-era Door of Meher (as Ara or Arwaa). Linguists Martin E. Huld and Birgit Anette Olsen state that the word arew is cognate to the Indian name Ravi, also meaning "sun". This etymological connection, argues H. Martirosyan, indicates an inherited Armeno-Aryan poetical expression.
 Astłik, cognate to the Mesopotamian goddess Inanna, identified with Venus. A fertility goddess and consort of Vahagn, sharing a temple with him in the city of Ashtishat.  The holiday of Vardavar was originally in honor of Astɫik. The name "Astɫik" derives from astɫ "star" from Proto-Indo-European *h₂stḗr plus the Armenian diminutive suffix -ik.
Ayg, goddess of the dawn.
Angeł - "the Invisible" (literally: "unseen"), god of the underworld. The main temple of Angeł was located at Angeł-tun (House of Angeł), which possibly corresponded to the Ingalova of Hittite and Ingelene/Ingilena of Greek and Latin records, likely located near modern Eğil. Comparable with Nergal and Hades.
Tork Angegh - "Given by Angeł". A great-grandson of Hayk. A monstrous and ugly hero. Threw massive boulders to sink enemy ships in the Black Sea. Sometimes equated with Thor and Polyphemus and possibly Tarḫunna.
Amanor - "The bearer of new fruits" (the god of the new year, Navasard). May or may not have been the same god as Vanatur. 
Vanatur - Either meaning "the Lord of Van" or "giving asylum", Vanatur was the god of hospitality. He may or may not have been the same god as Amanor. Later equated with Aramazd and Zeus. 
Nvard (Classical Armenian: Nuard) - Consort of Ara. Comparable with Nane  and Inanna (Ishtar). Likely developed into Anahit.
Tsovinar - "Nar of the Sea", goddess of waters and the ocean. Perhaps also a lightning goddess. Became the consort of Vahagn. Possibly connected to Inara.
Andndayin ōj, "the Abyssal Serpent" that lived in the black waters surrounding the world tree.

Hayasan

While the exact relationship between the Bronze Age kingdom of Hayasa-Azzi and Armenians is uncertain, many scholars believe that there is a connection (compare Hayasa with the Armenian endonyms Hayastan and Hay). Not much is known about the Hayasan pantheon but some names survive via Hittite records. The triad may have comprised U.GUR, INANNA, and Tarumu.

U.GUR - The chief god of the Hayasan pantheon. Represented by the divine ideogram U.GUR in Hittite records, which is equated with the Sumerian god Nergal. This god's name is unknown, but it may have been Angeł, Hayk, Ar, or a variation of the Hattian god Šulikatte. Probably the father of Terettitunnis and Tarumu. May also have been associated with Semitic El (Elkunirša in Hittite).
INANNA - The consort of the chief god of Hayasa. Like her husband, her name has not survived, but it is speculated that she was an early form of Anahit, and associated with the Hittite Asertu. 
Terittitunnis - Possibly an early form of Vahagn. Perhaps related to Greek Triton. 
Tarumu - The sixth god of the Hayasan pantheon. Perhaps connected to Tarhu. 
Baltaik - Possibly a goddess connected to West Semitic Ba‘alat (Astarte), with a probable Armenian diminutive suffix -ik (such as is present in the name of the goddess "Astɫik"). Alternately, it could etymologically derive from Proto Indo-European *bʰel- (meaning 'bright'), via the *bʰel-to form.
Izzistanus(?) - A proposed reconstruction of a damaged name "s/t-an-nu-us". Perhaps a version of Hattian Estan (Ezzi Estan: 'good Estan'). 
Unag-astuas or Unagastas - A deity mentioned in the treaty with the Hittites, but with unknown qualities. Likely  connected, etymologically, to Astvats (Classical Armenian: Astuas), a name which continues to be used today for God in Armenian Christianity. May have been a form of the Subarian god Astuvanu (Astupinu), who is equated with Sumerian Nergal.

Urartian
The gods of the Urartian pantheon were mostly borrowed from Hittite and Luwian, Hurrian, Semitic, and Indo-Iranian religions.

Ḫaldi or Khaldi - The chief god of Urartu. An Akkadian deity (with a possible Armenian or Greco-Armenian name—compare to Helios) not introduced into the Urartian pantheon until the reign of Ishpuini. Formed a triad with his sons Artinis and Teisheba. Equated with Baal and Mitra/Mihr. Sometimes also connected to Hayk.
Arubani - Wife of Ḫaldi. Goddess of fertility and art. Possibly an early form of Anahit.
Bagvarti or Bagmashtu (Bagbartu) - Wife of Ḫaldi. Possibly a regional variant (of Armenian or Indo-Iranian origins) of Arubani, or perhaps a different goddess entirely.
Teispas or Teisheba - Storm god, a son of Ḫaldi, with whom he formed the lead triad of the gods. A variation of Hurrian Teshub.
Shivini or Artinis - Sun god, a son of Ḫaldi, with whom he formed the lead triad of the gods. From the Proto-Indo-European and Hittite god Siu (compare with Zeus, Deus, etc.). Artinis is the Armenian form, literally meaning "sun god" and is possibly connected to Ara.
Selardi (or Melardi) - Moon god or goddess. Possibly the sister of Artinis (from Armenian siela 'sister'; ardi 'sun god').
Saris - Probably a corruption of Ishtar.
Huba - Wife of Theispas. Version of Hebat.
Keura - Possibly god of the land. 
Šebitu - Little is known about this god but Rusa III claimed to be his servant.

Iranian influence
Zoroastrian influences penetrated Armenian culture during the Achaemenid Empire, though conversion was incomplete and syncretistic, and the Persians and Armenians never appeared to identify with each other as co-religionists despite both referring to themselves as "Mazda worshipers."
 Aramazd - Cognate of the Iranian Ahura Mazda (or Ormazd), possibly mixed with Ara or Aram.  Head of the pantheon, identified with Zeus in the interpretatio graeca, with whom he shared many titles.  Along with Anahit and Vahagn formed a lead triad.  Equated with Vanatur and Aram and Ara, all of which he took aspects from. In time, the positive functions of Baal Shamin were absorbed by Aramazd. 
 Anadatus - The Armenian form of the Zoroastrian Amesha Spenta Ameretat.
 Anahit - Cognate of the Iranian Anahita. Probably originally related to Sumerian Inanna and Babylonian Anunit (Ishtar, Astarte) prior to Iranian presence in the region. The goddess of fertility and birth, and daughter or wife of Aramazd, Anahit is also identified with Artemis and Aphrodite. Temples dedicated to Anahit were established in Ani-Kammakh, Armavir, Artashat, Ashtishat. Ani is likely a derivation or alternate form of Anahit.
 Mihr - Cognate with the Iranian Mithra.  God of the sun and light, son of Aramazd, the brother of Anahit and Nane.  Historically, despite his high place in the pantheon, worship of Mihr was eclipsed by Vahagn (indeed, Mihr's worship appears to have been supplementary to Vahagn's), and little is known about his worship aside from similarities to the Iranian Mithra and the absence of the Mithraic mysteries.  Mihr was identified with Hephaestus by Movses Khorenatsi and later authors.  His center of worship was located in Bagaharich, and the temple of Garni was dedicated to him.
 Omanos - The Armenian form of the Zoroastrian Vohu Manah.
 Spandaramet - Cognate of the Iranian Spenta Armaiti, a daughter of Aramazd, and cthonic goddess of fertility, vineyards and the underworld.  Spandaramet was chosen by translators of some Armenian Bibles to convey the meaning of Διόνυσος) in 2 Maccabees 6:7.  Sometimes called Sandaramet or Santamaret denoting a connection to the underworld unique to Armenian theology, even in Christian writings. Her kingdom is said to be inhabited by evil spirits called Santarametakans.
 Tir or Tiur - Cognate to either the Iranian Tir (or Tishtrya) or (via Armenian dpir "scribe") the Babylonian Nabu.  In either case, the mercurial god of wisdom, written language, culture, and science; messenger of the gods and psychopomp.  Identified with the Greek Apollo.  Tir's role as psychopomp may have been absorbed from the Luwian thunder god Tarhunda, whose name had been used to translate that of the Mesopotamian underworld god Nergal.  Tir's temple was located near Artashat.
 Vahagn - A "k'aj" (brave). Etymologically derived from Iranian Verethragna (via Vahram -> Vram -> Vam + -agn), however, the Armenian Vahagn had little to do with his Iranian namesake. The storm god and dragon slayer, identified with the Greek Hercules, this identification went full circle when Armenian translators of the Bible used Vahagn to translate Ἡρακλῆς  in 2 Maccabees 4:19.  Sometimes referred to by the title Tsovean, particularly in his role as a god of the seas. Vahagn may have originally been the Hayasan god, Terittitunni, who adopted some features of the Hurro-Urartian storm god Teshub/Teisheba.  Christian folklore absorbed Vahagn's role as a storm or weather god into the archangel Gabriel.  Derik housed the central temple to Vahagn.

Post-Alexandrian influences
 Barsamin - God of sky and weather, derived from the Semitic god Baal Shamin.
 Nane - Cognate of the Elamitic Nanē, (via the Babylonian Nanâ), also assimilating aspects of the Phrygian Cybele. Daughter of Aramazd, sister of Anahit and Mihr. A goddess of motherhood, war, and wisdom.  Identified with Athena.  Her cult was related to Anahit, both of their temples located near each other in Gavar.

Monsters and spirits

 Al - The Al is a dwarfish evil spirit that attacks pregnant women and steals newborn babies. Described as half-animal and half-man, its teeth are of iron and nails of brass or copper. It usually wears a pointed hat covered in bells, and can become invisible.
 Aralez - Aralezner - The oldest gods in the Armenian pantheon, Aralez are dog-like creatures (modeled on Gampr) with powers to resuscitate fallen warriors and resurrect the dead by licking wounds clean.
 Devs - The Dev are air-composed spirit creatures originating from Zoroastrian mythology (the Daevas), and share many similarities to angels and demons. They reside in stony places and ruins, and usually keep to themselves.
 Shahapet - The Shahapet (Սհահապետ), also called Khshathrapti, Shavod, Shoithrapaiti, Shvaz and Shvod, were usually friendly guardian spirits of Armenian, Slavic and Persian mythology, who typically appeared in the form of serpents. They inhabited houses, orchards, fields, forests and graveyards, among other places. The Shvaz type was more agriculturally oriented, while the Shvod was a guardian of the home. A Shvod who is well-treated may reward the home's inhabitants with gold, but if mistreated might cause strife and leave.
 Nhang - The Nhang was a river-dwelling serpent-monster with shape shifting powers, often connected to the more conventional Armenian dragons. The creature could change into a seal or lure a man by transforming into a woman, then drag in and drown the victim to drink its blood. The word "Nhang" is sometimes used as a generic term for a sea-monster in ancient Armenian literature.
 Piatek - The Piatek is a large mammalian creature similar to a wingless griffin.
Vishap - A dragon closely associated with water, similar to the Leviathan. It is usually depicted as a winged snake or with a combination of elements from different animals. Prior to Iranian domination in Armenia, the dragons may have been called "gegh". May have been connected to Hurrian Ullikummi and Hittite Illuyanka.

Heroes and legendary monarchs

These figures are mainly known through post-Christian sources, but have belonged to the pre-Christian mythology. Many seem to be derived from Proto-Indo-European mythologies and religious traditions. It is suspected that Hayk, Ara, and Aram were originally deities, possibly from the oldest Armenian pantheon.

 Ara the Handsome, son of Aram. A handsome warrior slain in a war against Semiramis, in some versions brought back to life by her prayers. Possibly, originally a personified version of the sun god Ar (Arev), likely mentioned on the Urartian-era Door of Meher.
 Aram, slayer of the giant Barsamin, possibly originally a war god known as Aremenius. Father of Ara. The name Aram is likely an Armenian that directly developed from Proto-Indo-European *rēmo-, meaning "black". The name is related to Hindu Rama.
 Hayk, legendary forefather of the Armenians, who led a successful rebellion against a Babylonian king named Bel.  When Bel and his armies pursued Hayk and his people, Hayk fired an arrow across the battle field, killing Bel and scaring off his forces. Said to have been a giant. Possibly, a thunder/storm god originally. Equated with Ḫaldi, Mitra, and Orion. The name Hayk may derive from Proto-Indo-European *poti- (lord, master, patriarch).
 Karapet, a pre-Christian Armenian mythological character identified with John the Baptist after the adoption of Christianity by the Armenians. Karapet is usually represented as a glittering long-haired thunder-god with a purple crown and a cross.
 Nimrod, great-grandson of Noah and the king of Shinar, Nimrod is depicted in the Bible as both a man of power in the earth and a mighty hunter.
 Sanasar and Baghdasar, two brothers founded the town of Sason, ushering in the eponymous state. Sanasar was considered the ancestor of several generations of heroes of Sassoon. It is said that their mother was subject to a miraculous pregnancy, by drinking water from a certain fountain.
 Sargis, a hero, associated with pre-Christian myths, later identified with Christian saints who bore the same name. He is represented as a tall, slender, handsome knight mounted upon a white horse. Sarkis is able to raise the wind, storms and blizzards, and turn them against enemies.
 Shamiram, the legendary queen of the Neo-Assyrian Empire who waged war to get Ara.
 Yervaz and Yervant (Classical Armenian: Eruaz and Eruand), mythical twins born from a woman of the Arsacid dynasty of Armenia, distinguished by enormous features and over-sensitivity.

Bibliography

See also 

 Proto-Indo-European mythology
 Hittite mythology and religion
 Zoroastrianism in Armenia
 Hinduism in Armenia
 Persian mythology
 The Golden-Headed Fish
 The Story of Zoulvisia

Footnotes

References

 
 
Indo-European mythology
Polytheism